Justice and Development Party may refer to several political parties, the best-known ones being:

 Justice and Development Party (Morocco)
 Justice and Development Party (Turkey)

Justice and Development Party may also refer to:

 Justice and Development Party (Tunisia)
 Movement for Justice and Development (Slovenia)
 Justice and Development Party (Tanzania) 
 Justice and Development Party (Libya)
 Movement for Justice and Development in Syria
 Party for Justice and Development (Burundi)
 For Justice and Development (Somalia)
 Justice and Development Front (Algeria)
Law and Justice Party (Poland)